WLMS (88.3 FM) was a radio station broadcasting a Contemporary Christian format until October 2008, licensed to Lecanto, Florida, United States. The station was owned by the Roman Catholic Diocese of Saint Petersburg from 1992 to 2008, simulcasting programs from WBVM in Tampa. In October 2008, the license for WLMS was sold to Central Florida Educational Foundation and WLMS ceased broadcasting to enable a power increase by WPOZ, also owned by Central Florida Educational Foundation. Following WLMS's closure, a new radio station in Cross City, WWLC 88.5 FM, would be established as its replacement.

History
The station went on the air as WZQF on March 8, 1991, changing it call sign to WDSP on March 2, 1992, and then WLMS on May 1, 1992, where it broadcast a gospel music format. As of July 2009, WLMS is no longer in the FCC database.

References

Defunct radio stations in the United States
LMS
Radio stations established in 1991
Radio stations disestablished in 2008
1991 establishments in Florida
2008 disestablishments in Florida
Defunct religious radio stations in the United States
LMS